Syndyophyllum is a plant genus of the family Euphorbiaceae, first described as a genus in 1900. It is native to Sumatra, Borneo, and New Guinea.

Species
 Syndyophyllum excelsum K.Schum. & Lauterb. - New Guinea
 Syndyophyllum occidentale (Airy Shaw) Welzen - Sumatra, Borneo

Formerly included
Syndyophyllum trinervium K.Schum. & Lauterb., synonym of Mallotus trinervius (K.Schum. & Lauterb.) Pax & K.Hoffm.

References

Euphorbiaceae genera
Acalyphoideae